Andreas Beck was the defending champion. He decided that he wouldn't play this year.
Ivan Dodig won in the grand finale 6–4, 6–3, against Dominik Meffert.

Seeds

Draw

Final four

Top half

Bottom half

External links
 Main Draw
 Qualifying Draw

BH Telecom Indoors - Singles
2009 Singles